Cube steak or cubed steak is a cut of beef, usually top round or top sirloin, tenderized and flattened by pounding with a meat tenderizer. The name refers to the shape of the indentations left by that process (called "cubing"). This is the most common cut of meat used for the American dish chicken-fried steak.

Minute steak 

In Ireland, Canada, United Kingdom, Australia, and some parts of the United States, cube steak is called a minute steak, because it can be cooked quickly.

Minute steak may also be distinguished by:
 simply referring to the cut, which is not necessarily tenderized;
 thinner than cube steak (hence does not need tenderizing);
 cut from sirloin or round, while cube steak cut is from chuck or round.

Bucket steak 
In parts of the southern United States, cube steak is also known as bucket steak, a name derived from the cardboard buckets in which stacks of them are often sold.

See also 
Swiss steak

Notes 

Cuts of beef